Caecilius of Calacte was a rhetorician and literary critic active in Rome during the reign of Augustus.  

The main source of information about Caecilius' life is the Suda, which says that he was from Sicily, originally called Archagathus, possibly of slave origins, and Jewish.  He was born about 50 BC in Calacte, and was probably a student of Apollodorus of Pergamon.  Both the Suda and Hermagoras say that he taught in Rome during the reign of Augustus.  The Suda reports that he lived until the reign of Hadrian, more than a century after the death of Augustus; this is possibly due to confusion with the quaestor Quintus Caecilius Niger.  A mention of Caecilius by Dionysius of Halicarnassus, who describes him as a friend in his Epistle to Pompey, may have been written as early as 30 BC and suggests that he may already have been an established critic by then.

He apparently wrote works of both history and literary criticism, but only a few fragments of his writings are extant. Athenaeus, the main source of information about Caecilius' historical works, reports that he wrote a history of the Servile Wars in Sicily, and refers to a work in which Caecilius mentioned the Sicilian tyrant Agathocles.  He also apparently wrote about the literary merits of historians, praising Thucydides but criticising Timaeus and Theopompus.

In his literary criticism, Caecilius was one of the first proponents of Atticism, alongside his friend Dionysius of Halicarnassus.  He wrote a treatise Against the Phrygians which apparently criticised the Asiatic style of rhetoric, producing a glossary of Attic phrases, and a treatise on the difference between the Attic and Asiatic styles of rhetoric.  He wrote an Art of Rhetoric and a work on rhetorical figures, which is quoted by Quintilian.  He also wrote a treatise on the Ten Attic Orators, and individual works on the speeches of Demosthenes, Antiphon, and Lysias.

Longinus' treatise On the Sublime was written in response to a work by Caecilius on the same topic.

References

Works cited
 
 
 
 

1st-century BC Greek people
1st-century Greek people
1st-century BCE Jews
1st-century Jews
1st-century BC Romans
1st-century Romans
1st-century BC writers
1st-century writers
1st-century BC historians
1st-century historians
Atticists (rhetoricians)
Sicilian Greeks
Roman-era Greeks
Greek-language historians from the Roman Empire
Hellenistic Jewish writers
Caecilii